Terrapin Point (formerly Terrapin Rocks) is an observation area located in Niagara Falls, New York at the western tip of Goat Island, next to the Canadian Horseshoe Falls. It is one of two major observation areas to overlook the falls and lower Niagara Gorge on the New York side, the other being Prospect Point further downriver.

Before the second half of the 20th century Terrapin Point was a group of rocks on the brink of the falls, disconnected from Goat Island. They were known as the Terrapin Rocks because they resembled giant tortoises.

In 1827, the then owners of the land on the American side, brothers Peter and Augustes Porter, built a 300-foot wooden bridge from Goat Island to just off the edge of the falls. In 1833, they added a lighthouse-like building, Terrapin Tower, to this viewpoint. Its height is estimated at 30 to 45 feet, its diameter at 12 feet. A spiral staircase inside allowed visitors to reach a viewing platform. Although the tower quickly attracted many visitors, there were also critical voices that found it disturbing in view of the beauty of the waterfalls. In 1873 the Porter brothers lost interest in the Terrapin Tower and blew it up. The bridge lasted longer. It can still be seen in photos from 1934. By 1954, however, it had also disappeared.

While work was being carried out on the dredging of the upper Niagara River in 1953 to spread the flow of water more evenly along the crest of the Horseshoe Falls, dirt and fill from the dredging was taken over to Terrapin Point, increasing its area and affording visitors views of the cataract not seen before. This area was closed to tourists in 1969, however, due to cracks being found in the rock foundation.

Terrapin Point was closed to visitors after 1969 when a large crack in the rock was discovered. In 1983 the United States Army Corps of Engineers blasted away 25,000 tons of unstable rock, added more landfill, and built diversion dams and retaining walls to force the water away from Terrapin Point. Altogether  of the Horseshoe Falls was eliminated, including  on the Canadian side. According to author Ginger Strand, the Horseshoe Falls is now entirely in Canada. Other sources say "most of" Horseshoe Falls  is in Canada. The remaining surface was scaled, and reopened to tourists in September 1983.

It was off Terrapin Point that daredevil Nik Wallenda began his high-wire walk over the Falls in June 2012. Wallenda was the first to walk a high-wire directly over the brink of the Falls.

References

External links 

Niagara Falls
Buildings and structures in Niagara Falls, New York
Tourist attractions in Niagara County, New York